William Brown and Raúl Ramírez won in the final 2-6, 7-6, 6-4 against Raymond Moore and Dennis Ralston.

Seeds

Draw

Finals

Top half

Bottom half

References
1975 American Airlines Tennis Games Draw - Men's Doubles

Doubles